Biotinylated retinoids are derivatives of retinol (vitamin A) carrying a biotin group for use in the isolation and purification of Retinol Binding Proteins involved in the visual cycle.  The first biotinylated retinoid was synthesized in 2002  and was used in the isolation and characterization of RPE65.

Notes and references

Retinoids